In semantics, a modifier is said to be restrictive (or defining) if it restricts the reference of its head. For example, in "the red car is fancier than the blue one", red and blue are restrictive, because they restrict which cars car and one are referring to. ("The car is fancier than the one" would make little sense.) By contrast, in "John's beautiful mother", beautiful is non-restrictive; "John's mother" identifies her sufficiently, whereas "beautiful" only serves to add more information.

Restrictive modifiers are also called defining, identifying, essential, or necessary; non-restrictive ones are also called non-defining, non-identifying, descriptive, or unnecessary (though this last term can be misleading). In certain cases, generally when restrictiveness is marked syntactically through the lack of commas, restrictive modifiers are called integrated and non-restrictive ones are called non-integrated or supplementary.

Restrictiveness in English

English does not generally mark modifiers for restrictiveness, with the exception of relative clauses: non-restrictive ones are set off in speech through intonation (with a pause beforehand and ) and in writing by using commas, whereas restrictive clauses are not. Furthermore, although restrictive clauses can be headed by any of the relative pronouns who(m), which, that or by a zero, non-restrictive clauses can only be headed by who(m) or which. For example:

Restrictive: We saw two puppies this morning: one that was born yesterday and one that was born last week. The one that (or which) was born yesterday is tiny.
Non-restrictive: We saw a puppy and a kitty this morning. The puppy, which was born yesterday, was tiny.

Although English does not consistently mark ordinary adjectives for restrictiveness, they can be marked periphrastically by moving them into relative clauses. For example, "John's beautiful wife" can be rewritten as "John's wife, who is beautiful", to avoid the suggestion of disambiguation between John's various wives.  A sentence unmarked for restrictiveness, like "The red car is fancier than the blue one," can—if necessary—be rephrased to make it explicitly restrictive or non-restrictive: 
Restrictive: The car that's red is fancier than the one that's blue.
Non-restrictive: The car, which is red, is fancier than the other, which is blue.

English speakers do not generally find such locutions necessary, however.

See also
 Apposition
 English relative clauses
 Relative clause
 Relative pronoun

Notes and references

Notes

Citations

Sources

 On the intonation question, see Beverly Colins and Inger M. Mees (2003), Practical Phonetics and Phonology, London: Routledge, .

Semantics
Grammar